James Wynn may refer to:

 Big Jim Wynn (1908-1977), American jump blues musician
 Jimmy Wynn (footballer) (1910-1986), English footballer, played for Southport, Rotherham Utd, and Rochdale
 Jimmy Wynn (1942-2020), American baseball player
 James A. Wynn Jr. (born 1954), American jurist
 James Wynn (actor), British actor, author and film maker

See also
 James Wynne (disambiguation)